Baran  is a Polish village in the administrative district of Gmina Firlej, within Lubartów County, Lublin Voivodeship, in eastern Poland.

History 
From 1975 to 1998, the village was administrated under the former Voivodeship of Lublin. Since 1999 it has been part of the new Lublin Voivodeship.

References

Baran